The Macon Peaches was the predominant name of the American minor league baseball franchise representing Macon, Georgia, during the 20th century.

The Peaches nickname was also used from 1961–1964, 1966–1967, and 1980–1982. Much of that time, the Peaches played in the original South Atlantic "Sally" League, although they made brief appearances in the Southeastern League and the Southern Association. During the 1980s, the Peaches were members of the modern South Atlantic League. After 1929, the team played at Luther Williams Field.

Macon was represented by professional baseball teams in the 19th century and joined the Sally League in 1904 as the Highlanders. From 1956–1960, Macon's team was known as the Macon Dodgers, adopting the name of their parent club. 

In 1980, a new Macon Peaches team formed and after 1982, this franchise adopted the name Redbirds and then Pirates. This team relocated to Augusta, Georgia and became the Augusta Pirates and were renamed again to Augusta GreenJackets. 

After the 1990 season, the South Atlantic League returned to Macon with the relocation of the Sumter Braves and the Sumter Braves became the Macon Braves, Macon's last affiliated team and last South Atlantic League team. The Macon Braves relocated to Rome, Georgia and were renamed Rome Braves.

Reds' farm team produced Rose, Pérez, May and Helms
From 1962–1964, the Peaches were an important upper-level affiliate (Double-A after 1962) of the Cincinnati Reds, producing Pete Rose, Tony Pérez, Lee May and Tommy Helms. All four were members of Cincinnati's first "Big Red Machine" team, the  National League champions.

Macon was Rose's last minor league address before he launched his Major League career as the  National League Rookie of the Year. He had batted .330 for the 1962 Peaches.

Macon Braves
The Macon Braves were a class-A minor league baseball team associated with the Atlanta Braves and was the transplanted Sumter Braves. The team was known as the Macon Braves from 1991 to 2002. In 2003, the Macon Braves were moved to Rome, Georgia.  The team is now known as the Rome Braves. Luther Williams Field was the home stadium for the Macon Braves. After losing the Macon Braves, Macon was home to an Independent professional team, the Macon Music in the South Coast League, for one season (2007) as well as a different independent league baseball team known as the Macon Pinetoppers (2010) that called Luther Williams Field "home". Many well known major league players came from the Macon Braves, such as Chipper Jones, Andruw Jones, Rafael Furcal, Tony Graffanino, John Rocker, John Smoltz, and Marcus Giles.

An independent league baseball team called the Macon Peaches played in the 21st century Southeastern League in 2003.

Notable players 

Baseball Hall of Fame alumni
 Al Lopez Inducted, 1997
 Tony Pérez (1963)  Inducted, 2000

 John Smoltz (1998, 2001) Inducted, 2015

 Chipper Jones (1991) Inducted, 2018

Notable Macon Alumni 

 Moises Alou (1987) 6 x MLB All-Star

 Steve Avery (2000) MLB All-Star

 Stan Belinda (1987)

 Matt Belisle (2000)

 Rube Benton (1910)
Jim Brosnan (1966)
Jackie Brown
Smoky Burgess (1947)  9 x MLB All-Star
Al Campanis (1940)

 Bruce Chen (1997)

 Vince Coleman (1983) 2 x MLB All-Star; 1985 NL Rookie of the Year
Bruce Dal Canton (1967)

 Abner Dalrymple (1893) 1885 NL Home Run Leader
Dock Ellis (1967) MLB All-Star

 Raymond Doster (1967-1968)

 Phil Douglas (1911)

 Jermaine Dye (1994) 2 x MLB All-Star

 Rafael Furcal (1999) 3 x MLB All-Star; 2000 NL Rookie of the Year
Chick Fullis (1927)

 Marcus Giles (1998) MLB All-Star

 Tony Graffanino (1992) 
Tommy Helms (1962) 2 x MLB All-Star; 1966 NL Rookie of the Year

 Wes Helms (1995)
Bobo Holloman (1947–1948)

 Kelly Johnson (2001)

 Andruw Jones (1996) 10 x Gold Glove; 5 x MLB All-Star

 David Justice (1991) 3 x MLB All-Star; 1990 NL Rookie of the Year

 Ray King (1996)
 Jason Marquis (1997) MLB All-Star
Gordon Maltzberger
Lee May (1963) 3 x MLB All-Star; 1976 AL RBI Leader
Bob Melvin (1981) 2 x MLB Manager of the Year
 Orlando Merced (1986-1987)
 Pepper Martin (1955, MGR) 4 x MLB All-Star
 Kevin Millwood (1994-1995, 2001) MLB All-Star; 2005 NL ERA Leader
Bob Moose (1963)
Billy Muffett (1955)
Bobo Newsom (1930) 4 x MLB All-Star
Al Oliver (1967) 7 x MLB All-Star; 1982 AL Batting Champion
Bob Oliver (1967)
Andy Pafko (1942) 5 x MLB All-Star
 Tom Pagnozzi (1983) MLB All-Star
 Odalis Perez (1997) MLB All-Star
Mel Queen (1962)
Paul Richards (1929-1930)
Pete Rose (1962) 17 x MLB All-Star; 1963 NL Rookie of the Year; All-Time MLB Hits Leader
Johnny Rucker
Barney Schultz (1950)
Art Shamsky (1962)
 John Smiley (1984-1985) 2 x MLB All-Star
Eddie Stanky (1939, 1941) 3 x MLB All-Star
Carl Taylor
Hippo Vaughn (1909) 1918 NL ERA, Wins, Strikeout Leader
 Adam Wainwright (2001) 3 x MLB All-Star

See also
 Macon Bacon

References
Notes

Sources

 Jackie Robinson visits Macon to play the Peaches
Baseball Reference

Chicago Cubs minor league affiliates
Cincinnati Reds minor league affiliates
Defunct Southern League (1964–present) teams
Southern League (1885–1899) teams
Philadelphia Phillies minor league affiliates
Pittsburgh Pirates minor league affiliates
Professional baseball teams in Georgia (U.S. state)
Sports in Macon, Georgia
Atlanta Braves minor league affiliates
St. Louis Cardinals minor league affiliates
Detroit Tigers minor league affiliates
Brooklyn Dodgers minor league affiliates
Los Angeles Dodgers minor league affiliates
1892 establishments in Georgia (U.S. state)
2002 disestablishments in Georgia (U.S. state)
Baseball teams established in 1892
Sports clubs disestablished in 2003
Defunct independent baseball league teams
Southeastern League teams
South Atlantic League (1904–1963) teams
Defunct baseball teams in Georgia
Defunct South Atlantic League teams
Baseball teams disestablished in 2003